The first Hasina cabinet  was the Government of Bangladesh during the 7th legislative session of the Jatiya Sangsad following the 1996 general election, and left office on 15 July 2001.

Cabinet
The cabinet was composed of the following ministers:

State ministers

Deputy ministers

Shuffles
 1 January 1998
 Mosharraf Hossain became the Minister for Civil Aviation and Tourism
 Mofazzal Hossain Chowdhury became the Minister of State for Local Government, Rural Development and Cooperatives
 Rafiqul Islam became the Minister of State for Energy, Power and Mineral Resources
 AKM Jahangir Hossain became the Minister of State for Textiles 
 Saber Hossain Chowdhury became the Deputy Minister for Shipping
 Dhirendra Debnath Shambhu became the Deputy Minister for Food
 M A Mannan was promoted to full minister of Labour and Manpower
 Muhiuddin Khan Alamgir was stripped of being the minister of Civil Aviation and Tourism
  Zinnatunnessa Talukdar was made the state minister of Primary and Mass Education

References

Cabinets established in 1996
Cabinets disestablished in 2001
Sheikh Hasina ministries